In enzymology, an aspartate 4-decarboxylase is an enzyme that catalyzes the chemical reaction

L-aspartate  L-alanine + CO2

Hence, this enzyme has one substrate, L-aspartate, and two products, L-alanine and CO2.  This reaction is the basis of the industrial synthesis of L-alanine.

This enzyme belongs to the family of lyases, specifically the carboxy-lyases, which cleave carbon-carbon bonds.  The systematic name of this enzyme class is L-aspartate 4-carboxy-lyase (L-alanine-forming). Other names in common use include desulfinase, aminomalonic decarboxylase, aspartate beta-decarboxylase, aspartate omega-decarboxylase, aspartic omega-decarboxylase, aspartic beta-decarboxylase, L-aspartate beta-decarboxylase, cysteine sulfinic desulfinase, L-cysteine sulfinate acid desulfinase, and L-aspartate 4-carboxy-lyase.  This enzyme participates in alanine and aspartate metabolism and cysteine metabolism.  It employs one cofactor, pyridoxal phosphate.

References

 
 
 
 

EC 4.1.1
Pyridoxal phosphate enzymes
Enzymes of unknown structure